The God of Cookery is a 1996 Hong Kong comedy film which was co-directed by Stephen Chow and Lee Lik-chi. The film features an ensemble cast include Stephen Chow, Karen Mok, Vincent Kok and Richard Ng.

Synopsis
Stephen Chow (the Chinese characters used for Chow's name in the movie are different from Chow's actual name) is a corrupt celebrity chef who secretly knows very little about cooking, runs a successful business empire, and is willing to hawk any product for a price. Arrogant and cocky, Chow is dubbed the "God of Cookery" and appears as a judge for culinary competitions rigged to make him look good.

Bull Tong (Vincent Kok), posing as an understudy and conspiring with Chow's business partner (Ng Man Tat) to overthrow him, exposes Chow as a fraud during the opening ceremony of Chow's 50th restaurant. Bull is declared the new "God of Cookery" and takes over Chow's corrupt empire. Ruined, Chow lives on the streets in an area known as Temple Street. There, he orders a bowl of "assorted noodles" from disfigured and uncouth food cart owner Turkey (Karen Mok) and criticises it for its lack of taste, terrible preparation, and unsanitary ingredients. During a heated exchange, Chow demands respect and reveals himself to be the fallen "God of Cookery" but then begs her for some money. Thugs beat him for his panhandling, but Turkey orders them away, taking pity on Chow and giving him a bowl of barbecue pork on rice. Chow is moved and declares it delicious.

Turkey and her rival street vendor, Goosehead (Lee Siu-Kei), conduct gang warfare to see which vendor can sell the two best-selling dishes: beef balls and "pissing" shrimp. Chow manages to unite the two rival vendors by combining the two dishes into a new dish, "Pissing Beef Balls", which the three of them could sell together. It becomes a huge success, and the vendors convince Chow to enroll in a culinary school in order to reclaim the title he lost, but not before he discovers that Turkey idolised Chow as the "God of Cookery" and received her scarred appearance after fighting a local gang leader who ruined her poster of Chow.

The success of the "Pissing Beef Balls" alarms Bull, the new "God of Cookery", who arranges for Chow to be assassinated on the way to culinary school. While searching for the school, Chow finds that Turkey has followed him, asking him to complete a drawing of a romantic heart for her as a souvenir for her to remember him by. Knowing she is in love with him, Chow callously rebuffs her. Turkey reminds him of all she did for him, including her injuries, but Chow retorts that he never asked for her to do those things for him. As he tells her that he can never love her, Turkey notices the approaching assassin and takes the bullet for Chow. Chow, also presumed dead, disappears.

One month later, Bull enters the "God of Cookery" competition (a parody of Iron Chef) as the heavy favourite to retain the title. Chow arrives at the competition at the last minute and reveals to Tong what had happened: Chow escaped the assassin's second bullet and found his way to a Shaolin Monastery, where head monk Wet Dream (a spoof on the Chinese word for nocturnal spermatorrhoea) nursed him back to health. However, Wet Dream would not allow Chow to leave the temple until he was well-versed in the ways of the Shaolin arts, a point made moot when it is revealed the culinary school he was going to attend was, in fact, the temple's kitchen—the same kitchen Bull had trained at for 10 years but subsequently dropped out of. While training, Chow continually mourned for Turkey and was overcome with grief and remorse over his careless treatment of her. The depth of his feeling, which caused his hair to grow white, convinced Wet Dream to allow him his departure from the monastery.

The competition between Chow and Tong begins in earnest, with the two attempting to make identical "Buddha Jumping Wall" dishes. Each chef tries to sabotage the other's dish in a comedic wuxia fashion by attacking the other using their ingredients and kitchen implements, but Tong prevails when Chow's ex-business partner makes Chow's container explode with a bomb. With few materials and little time remaining, Chow prepares "Sorrowful Rice", a simple dish of barbecue pork rice, the same dish Turkey first gave to him while he was living on the streets. Although "Sorrowful Rice" is the better dish, Tong had already blackmailed the judge (Nancy Sit) into rigging the contest. As Bull is fraudulently crowned the winner, Chow remarks that there is no one "God of Cookery" and that any person who cooks with heart can be the "God of Cookery". In an act of divine intervention, the Imperial Court of Heaven descends upon the competition and reveal that in another life, Chow was a heavenly assistant to the Kitchen God, before being sent to Earth to live as a human as punishment for revealing culinary secrets to mankind. Moved by his sorrow and his humbleness, they forgive him. They then transform Chow's former business partner into a bulldog and perforate Bull's chest with a large hole.

After the competition, Chow celebrates Christmas with his vendor friends in Temple Street, where Goosehead reveals that Turkey survived the assassination. Having caught the bullet meant for Chow with her gold-plated teeth and reconstructed her face with plastic surgery and dental work, she appears before him and asks how she looks. Chow responds by throwing her the completed drawing of two arrow-pierced hearts.

Cast
 Stephen Chow as 'Stephen Chow' (史提芬周 Sitaifan Chow)
 Karen Mok as Turkey (火雞, Fo Gai) / Guanyin
 Vincent Kok as Bull Tong (唐牛, Tong Ngau)
 Ng Man-tat as Uncle
 Lee Siu-Kei as Goosehead (鵝頭, Ngo Tau)
 Tats Lau as Wet Dream (夢遺, Mung Wai)
 Christy Chung as the girl in the dream sequence (cameo)
 Nancy Sit as herself (cameo)
 Lee Kin-yan as the nose-picking transvestite (cameo)
 Law Kar-ying as competition host
 Stephen Au
 Lam Suet
 Tin Kai-Man
 Kingdom Yuen

In-film references
 The scenes in the Buddhist monastery reference 18 Bronzemen, as the monks call themselves the "18 Brassmen".
 "Sorrowful Rice" (黯然銷魂飯) is a reference to Yang Guo's Melancholic Palms (黯然銷魂掌) technique. The final battle between Chow and Bull Tong itself contains a couple of tongue-in-cheek references to Jin Yong (Louis Cha)'s The Heaven Sword and Dragon Saber and The Legend of the Condor Heroes in the original Cantonese dialogue, which is however obscured in the English subtitles.

Canceled Remake 
In 1998, director and star Stephen Chow planned to remake God of Cookery for English markets with Jim Carrey playing the lead role. The film was being adapted into English by writer Marc Hyman, and film rights were purchased by 20th Century Fox, but the film failed to come to fruition.

See also
 Chūka Ichiban! (1995 debut), a cooking manga and anime series set in China
 Cook Up a Storm (2017), a Chinese cooking film
 God of Gamblers II (1990), a Stephen Chow gambling film
 God of Gamblers III: Back to Shanghai (1991), a Stephen Chow gambling film

References

External links
 
 The GOD of Cookery at Hong Kong Cinemagic
 
 

1996 comedy films 
1996 films
Hong Kong action comedy films 
1990s Cantonese-language films
Cooking films
Films directed by Stephen Chow
Hong Kong comedy films 
Hong Kong cuisine
Transgender-related films
Films directed by Lee Lik-chi
Chinese New Year films
1990s Hong Kong films